Daniel Otelemaba Amachree (born 14 November 1963) is a progressive politician in Rivers State, Nigeria. He is a former Speaker of the Rivers State House of Assembly. He was elected as the Speaker of the House on 31 May 2011, during the first meeting of the 7th Assembly. Between 1999 and 2015, Amachree has been elected to four terms as a member of the House of Assembly, representing the Asari-Toru I constituency. He has been named the longest serving member in any State House of Assembly in Nigeria.

Education
Amachree's education started at Buguma, where he attended Baptist State School from 1970 to 1975. He subsequently
enrolled at Baptist High School, Port Harcourt, where he earned his West African Senior School Certificate in 1980. After a session at the Rivers State School of Basic Studies, he gained admission into the University of Port Harcourt, graduating in 1988 with a bachelor's degree in Physics and Material Science. He continued his studies at the Rivers State University of Science and Technology and by 2010, he had obtained a postgraduate diploma in Business Studies along with Master of Business Administration and Master of Science in International Economics and Finance.

Political career

Personal life
Amachree is a Christian of the Baptist faith. He is married to Otorusinya Gilda Amachree, and they have three sons and one daughter.

References

1963 births
Living people
Speakers of the Rivers State House of Assembly
People from Asari-Toru
University of Port Harcourt alumni
Rivers State University alumni
Rivers State Peoples Democratic Party politicians
All Progressives Congress politicians
Nigerian Christians